Tadao Uchikoshi (born 30 October 1965) is a Japanese male former long-distance runner who specialised in the marathon. He represented his nation at the 1993 World Championships in Athletics and placed fifth in a time of 2:17:54 hours.

Uchikoshi was runner-up behind Tesfaye Tafa at the Amsterdam Marathon in 1991, finishing in 2:13:52 hours. He was runner-up at the Hokkaido Marathon in 1992 and was the second placed Japanese (sixth overall) at the 1993 Tokyo International Marathon. A personal best of 2:12:52 hours came in a fourth-place finish at the 1994 Rotterdam Marathon, but he failed to place highly in a marathon thereafter. He was a member of the Snow Brand Milk Products corporate running team. He attended Juntendo University and was part of the winning team for the 1988 Hakone Ekiden while there.

International competitions

References

External links

Living people
1965 births
Japanese male marathon runners
Japanese male long-distance runners
World Athletics Championships athletes for Japan